Mary Ann Smart (29 March 1964 in Toronto) is a Canadian-born musicologist.

Smart earned a doctorate from Cornell University and is the Terrill Professor of Music at the University of California, Berkeley. She specializes in the study of nineteenth century opera.

Selected publications

References

1964 births
Living people
Canadian musicologists
Writers from Toronto
21st-century Canadian women writers
Women musicologists
Cornell University alumni
University of California, Berkeley faculty
Canadian expatriates in the United States